The Tustumena Glacier is a glacier located on the Kenai Peninsula of Alaska. The Tustumena Glacier begins in the Harding Icefield and makes its way down west for about  until its terminus roughly  before Tustumena Lake. The glacier is retreating due to global warming.

A small lake called Arctic Lake sits alongside Tustumena Glacier, with its outflow underneath the ice. This lake periodically fills up and then drains as the glacier moves, leaving icebergs stranded in the sand.

The Alaska Marine Highway ferry M/V Tustumena derives its name from this glacier.

See also
 List of glaciers

References

External links
Trek around the glaciers of the Harding Icefield

Glaciers of Alaska
Glaciers of Kenai Peninsula Borough, Alaska